USS Camden (AOE-2) was the second ship of the United States Navy named after the city of Camden, New Jersey that lies on the Delaware River across from Philadelphia, Pennsylvania.

History

Camden was commissioned on 1 April 1967 as the second of four vessels in its class. It was also the 542nd and final contract in the 68-year history of New York Shipbuilding, and the last vessel completed and launched at the shipyard. It was assigned to the Pacific Fleet in September 1967 and was initially homeported in Long Beach, California. For their accomplishments during her first deployment to WestPac in 1968–1969, her crew was awarded the Meritorious Unit Commendation.

In August 1974, Camden moved to its new homeport of Bremerton, Washington. The ship operated extensively up and down the West Coast of the United States and deployed frequently to the Western Pacific and Indian Oceans to support units of the Seventh Fleet.

In 1980, Camden moved again to the homeport of Bremerton, Washington for an overhaul.

On 20 July 1983 The New York Times reported that Camden along with seven other vessels in the Ranger Carrier Battle Group left San Diego on Friday 15 July 1983 and were headed for the western Pacific when they were rerouted and ordered to steam for Central America to conduct training and flight operations in areas off the coasts of Nicaragua, El Salvador and Honduras as part of major military exercises planned for that summer.

On 17 May 1987 USS Camden was redirected to assist  after it was attacked by unfriendly fire. USS Camdens job was to unload all of the weapons on board Stark in case of further attack.

Search efforts were abandoned about 24 hours later for the Sea Knight, which had been operating from Camden. Two ships were close by when the aircraft dropped into the water. Two helicopters were immediately launched for an air search, and the ships in the area launched whaleboats to assist in the search. Camden was deployed to resupply the aircraft carrier  and support ships, which were returning to the U.S. from duty in the Persian Gulf after taking part in Operation Desert Storm. In 1992 CURV-III recovered the CH-47 Sea Knight helicopter off of Wake Island in 1992 from a depth of 17,251 feet, the world’s record for deepest salvage at the time.

In March 1996, Camden was awarded its third consecutive Battle "E" for demonstrating excellence in all warfare and mission categories.

In 2004, Camden won the Battle "E" again. This was the final year of Battle "E" eligibility for the Sacramento-class fast combat support ship.

In January 2005, Camden left on its final deployment, an eight-month world tour with  escorting that carrier to its new homeport in Norfolk, Virginia. Camden was decommissioned 14 October 2005 at Naval Base Kitsap, Bremerton, Washington, and was disposed of by scrapping at Esco Marine, in Brownsville, Texas.

Power plant
Camdens power plant was one of two built for the Iowa-class battleship , which was cancelled in 1947 when 72.1 percent complete. The other Kentucky power plant was used to power USS Sacramento, the lead ship of her class.

References

External links

 
 Federation of American Scientists: AOE-1 Sacramento Fast Combat Support Ship
 GlobalSecurity.org: AOE 2 Camden

 

Sacramento-class fast combat support ships
1965 ships
Gulf War ships of the United States
Ships built by New York Shipbuilding Corporation